An unofficial referendum on  use of Fobaproa funds was held in Mexico on 30 August 1998. It was organised by the opposition Party of the Democratic Revolution (PRD), who proposed that only small- and medium-sized businesses would be compensated by the funds. Slightly over 97% voted in favour of the PRD's proposal, and the Chamber of Deputies subsequently agreed to the change on 12 December by a vote of 325 to 159.

Results

References

1998 referendums
1998 in Mexico
Referendums in Mexico
August 1998 events in Mexico
1998 in Mexican politics